Horsley Priory was a medieval, monastic house in Gloucestershire, England.

Goda owned an estate at Horsley, in 1066. It was granted to Troarn Abbey by Roger de Montgomery before 1086. The original grant was said to provide for a prior, a monk, and a parish chaplain to reside at Horsley. From those provisions emerged the cell called Horsley Priory.

Troarn Abbey exchanged the priory with Bruton Priory for lands in Normandy in 1260. The priory of Horsley ceased to exist before 1380. Horsley manor was retained by Bruton Priory, until the Dissolution of the Monasteries in 1539. In 1541, Horsley was granted to Thomas Seymour.

Priors of Horsley 
Stephen, 1262, (fn. 28) occurs 1269
Walter de Horwood, occurs 1271
Richard de la Grave, 1292
William, 1298
William de Milverton, ob. 1329
Laurence de Haustede, 1329
Henry de Lisle, 1335 resigned 1357 (fn. 36)
Richard de Holt, 1357 resigned 1363 (fn. 38)
William Cary, 1363

References

External links

Monasteries in Gloucestershire
1080s establishments in England
Christian monasteries established in the 11th century
1539 disestablishments in England